Nemezis: Mysterious Journey III (Previously called Schizm 3: Nemezis), is an adventure game developed by Detalion Games (Roland Pantola studio, after Detalion S.C's shutdown), published by PlayWay S.A, powered by Unreal Engine 4, and the sequel to Schizm: Mysterious Journey and Schizm II: Chameleon. Unlike the previous games, the plotline is not authored by acclaimed Australian science fiction writer Terry Dowling. The game was released on 8 July 2021 on Steam and GoG.com.

Story 
In Nemezis: Mysterious Journey III, you return to the beautiful planet of Argilus (Schizm: Mysterious Journey storyline) as Amia and Bogard, two tourists seduced by a promotional offer, hoping for enjoyable and relaxing vacations.

References

2021 video games
Adventure games
PlayWay games
Single-player video games
Unreal Engine games
Video games developed in Poland
Windows games
Windows-only games
Detalion games